The September 11 attacks of 2001, in addition to being a unique act of terrorism, constituted a media event on a scale not seen since the advent of civilian global satellite links. Instant worldwide reaction and debate were made possible by round-the-clock television news organizations and by the internet. As a result, most of the events listed below were known by a large portion of the world's population as they occurred.
 
All times given are in Eastern Time Zone (EDT), or UTC−04:00.

Major events

7:59 a.m.: American Airlines Flight 11, a Boeing 767 with registration number N334AA, carrying 76 passengers (excluding the hijackers) and 11 crew members, departs 14 minutes late from Logan International Airport in Boston, bound for Los Angeles International Airport. Five hijackers are on board. Hijacker and ringleader Mohamed Atta will pilot the plane into the North Tower of the World Trade Center.

8:14: United Airlines Flight 175, a Boeing 767, with registration number N612UA carrying 56 passengers (excluding the hijackers) and 9 crew members, departs 14 minutes late from Logan International Airport in Boston, bound for Los Angeles International Airport. Five hijackers are on board. Lead hijacker-pilot Marwan al-Shehhi will pilot the plane into the South Tower of the World Trade Center (1973-2001).

8:14: Flight 11 is hijacked over central Massachusetts, turning first northwest, then south heading straight to New York.

8:20: American Airlines Flight 77, a Boeing 757 with registration number N644AA with 58 passengers (excluding the hijackers) and 6 crew members, departs 10 minutes late from Washington Dulles International Airport, for Los Angeles International Airport. Five hijackers are on board. Lead hijacker-pilot Hani Hanjour will pilot the plane into the West side of The Pentagon.

8:42: United Airlines Flight 93, a Boeing 757 with registration number N591UA with 37 passengers (excluding the hijackers) and 7 crew members, departs 42 minutes late from Newark International Airport (now Newark Liberty International Airport), bound for San Francisco International Airport. Four hijackers are on board. Lead hijacker-pilot is Ziad Jarrah. At this time, Flight 175 is being hijacked and Flight 11 is about to descend to New York and is 4 minutes away from crashing. 

At this time estimate, Flight 11 is about to descend over New York and is just minutes away from crashing.

8:46:40: Flight 11 crashes into the north face of the North Tower (1 WTC) of the World Trade Center, between floors 93 and 99. All passengers aboard are instantly killed with an unknown number inside the building. The aircraft enters the tower intact.

8:50–8:54 (approx.): Flight 77 is hijacked above southern Ohio, turning to the southeast. The transponder is turned off by hijacker-pilot Hani Hanjour.

9:03:02: Flight 175 crashes into the south face of the South Tower (2 WTC) of the World Trade Center, between floors 77 and 85. All passengers and crew are killed together with an unknown number inside the building. Parts of the plane, including the starboard engine, leave the building from its east and north sides, falling to the ground six blocks away. 

9:28: Flight 93 is hijacked above northern Ohio, turning to the southeast.

9:37:46: Flight 77 crashes into the western side of The Pentagon. All 59 passengers and crew are killed aboard the aircraft including an additional 125 (including emergency workers) on the ground. The crash starts a violent fire.

9:45: United States airspace is shut down by the Federal Aviation Administration; all operating aircraft are ordered to land at the nearest airport, and international flights are not permitted into the airspace.

9:57: The passengers aboard Flight 93 begin a revolt, planned by Todd Beamer, Mark Bingham, Tom Burnett, Jeremy Glick and others move against the hijackers in an attempt to take back the plane.

9:58:59: The South Tower of the World Trade Center collapses, 56 minutes after the impact of Flight 175. Speed is considered one of the likely factors during its much faster collapse unlike that of the North Tower. 

10:03:11: Flight 93 is crashed by its hijackers as a result of fighting in the cockpit 80 miles (129 km) southeast of Pittsburgh in Somerset County, Pennsylvania. Later reports indicate that passengers had learned about the World Trade Center and Pentagon crashes and were resisting the hijackers. The 9/11 Commission believed that Flight 93's target was either the United States Capitol building or the White House in Washington, D.C. but Khalid Sheikh Mohammed claims that the United States Capitol was the main target. 

10:28:25: The North Tower of the World Trade Center collapses, 1 hour and 42 minutes after the impact of Flight 11. The Marriott Hotel, located at the base of the two towers, is also destroyed.

10:50:19: All five stories of the Pentagon on the West side where American 77 crashed mostly at 1st-3rd floor level collapse due to the fire started by the crash.

5:20:33 p.m.: 7 World Trade Center, a 47-story building, collapses after fires started inside the building.

Detailed timeline of events

6:00 a.m.
6:00: Mohamed Atta and Abdulaziz al-Omari travel on Colgan Air Flight 5930 from Portland International Jetport in Portland, Maine, to Logan International Airport in Boston, Massachusetts.

6:00: Polls open for primaries for the New York City mayoral elections, as well as other local offices.

6:31: President Bush goes for an early-morning jog around the Colony Beach and Tennis Resort on Longboat Key, Florida, where he and his staff had spent the night.

6:45: Atta and al-Omari arrive at Logan International Airport.

6:52: Marwan al-Shehhi calls Atta from another terminal at Logan to confirm that the plans for the attack are set.

7:00 a.m.
7:03–7:39: Ziad Jarrah and his hijacking team arrives at Newark International Airport (now Newark Liberty International Airport) and check in for United Airlines Flight 93.

7:15: Khalid al-Mihdhar and Majed Moqed arrive at Washington Dulles International Airport and check in for American Airlines Flight 77.

7:18: al-Mihdhar and Moqed arrive at the security checkpoint at Washington Dulles International Airport. Both set off alarms and are consequently given a more thorough search.

7:23–7:28: Al-Shehhi and his hijacking team board Flight 175.

7:35–7:40: Atta and his hijacking team board American Airlines Flight 11.

7:35: Hani Hanjour arrives at the security checkpoint at Washington Dulles International Airport. He passes through the checkpoint without suspicion or setting off any alarms.

7:39–7:48: Jarrah and his hijacking team board Flight 93.

7:40: Flight 11 is pushed back from Gate B32 at Logan International Airport.

7:46: Jarrah calls al-Shehhi from Newark International Airport (now Newark Liberty International Airport) to also confirm the attacks were ready to begin.

7:50: Hanjour and his four fellow hijackers board Flight 77.

7:58: United Airlines Flight 175 is pushed back from Gate C19 at Logan International Airport.

7:59: Flight 11, a Boeing 767 carrying 81 passengers and 11 crew members, departs 14 minutes late from Logan International Airport in Boston. Its destination is Los Angeles International Airport (LAX) in Los Angeles, California.

8:00 a.m.

8:00: President Bush has his daily intelligence briefing. The material is routine, mostly concerning the Al-Aqsa Intifada and other Israeli-Palestinian issues. He calls Condoleezza Rice about one item, but there is no mention in the report of Osama bin Laden or al-Qaeda. The briefing lasts about twenty minutes, after which he says goodbye to the resort staff and departs in his motorcade. As the President's scheduled event is considered a garden variety trip to promote his education agenda, Chief of Staff Andrew Card remarks to him "It should be an easy day."

8:01: United Airlines Flight 93 is pushed back from Gate A17 at Newark International Airport.

8:09: Flight 77 is pushed back from Gate D26 at Dulles International Airport.

8:13:35: Flight 11 has its last routine communication with the Federal Aviation Administration's (FAA's) Boston Air Route Traffic Control Center (hereinafter "Boston Center").

Boston Center: American 11, turn twenty degrees right.

American Airlines Flight 11: Turning right, American 11.

8:13:52: Boston Center Sector 46 controller Pete Zalewski instructs Flight 11 to climb to 35,000 feet twice, but receives no reply. He informs the Athens Sector controller that the flight is "NORDO" (no radio). Boston Center continues to attempt to re-establish contact with the flight without success.

8:14: Flight 11 is hijacked when hijackers Waleed and Wail al-Shehri rise from seats 2A and 2B and stab flight attendants Karen Martin and Barbara Arestegui. Atta rises from seat 8D and approaches the cockpit. Passenger Daniel Lewin rises from seat 9B and tries to stop Atta but is fatally stabbed by hijacker Satam al-Suqami, who sat in 10B. The hijackers also spray Mace in the first and business class cabins. Flight attendant Madeline Amy Sweeney reports being shown a bomb by one of the hijackers.

8:14: Flight 175, another fully fueled Boeing 767, carrying 56 passengers and nine crew members, also departs from Logan International Airport in Boston; its destination is also Los Angeles International Airport. Five hijackers are aboard. One of them, most likely al-Shehhi, communicated with Mohammed Atta shortly before American Airlines Flight 11's takeoff.

8:19: Betty Ong, a flight attendant on Flight 11, alerts an American Airlines reservations center in Cary, North Carolina, to the hijacking via an airphone: "[I'm] number 3 in the back. The cockpit is not answering, somebody's stabbed in business class—and I think there's Mace—that we can't breathe—I don't know, I think we're getting hijacked." She then tells of the stabbings of two flight attendants.

8:20: Boston Center flight controllers decide that Flight 11 has probably been hijacked.

8:20: Flight 77, a Boeing 757 with 58 passengers and six crew members, departs from Washington Dulles International Airport, for Los Angeles International Airport. Five hijackers are aboard.

8:21: Flight 11's transponder signal is turned off, but the flight can still be tracked via primary radar by Boston Center; prior to the 9/11 Commission's report, news organizations reported this time as 8:13 or immediately thereafter.

8:24: A radio transmission comes from Flight 11: "Eh..... We have some planes. Just stay quiet, and you'll be okay. We are returning to the airport." It is believed that Atta mistakenly held a button directing his voice to radio rather than to the plane's cabin as he intended. A few seconds later, a second transmission is received, in which Atta says "Nobody move. Everything will be okay. If you try to make any moves, you'll endanger yourself and the airplane. Just stay quiet."

8:26:30: Flight 11 makes a 100-degree turn to the south, following the Hudson River toward New York City.

8:29:24: Boston Center alerts the neighboring Cleveland and New York ARTCCs regarding Flight 11. The flight's position is estimated to be fifteen miles (24 km) southwest of Albany. The North American Aerospace Defense Command (NORAD) is not yet alerted.

8:33: Flight 175 reaches its assigned cruising altitude of 31,000 feet.

8:33:59: A third transmission from Atta onboard Flight 11: "Nobody move please. We are going back to the airport. Don't try to make any stupid moves."

8:34: Boston Center traffic manager Dan Bueno notifies the tower controller at Otis Air National Guard Base at Cape Cod of the hijacking of Flight 11. The controller directs Bueno to contact Northeast Air Defense Sector (NEADS), the northeast sector of NORAD. The controller then notifies Otis Operations Center that a call from NEADS might be coming. Two F-15 pilots begin to suit up.

8:37: Flight 175 confirms sighting of hijacked Flight 11 to flight controllers, 10 miles (16 km) to its south.

8:37:30: Flight 11 begins a rapid descent at 3,200 feet per minute, starting from an altitude of 29,000 feet. This descent continues until the moment of impact with the North Tower. Half a minute later, having descended one thousand feet, the flight makes a slight southward turn.

8:37:52: Boston Center control notifies NEADS of the hijacking of Flight 11, the first notification received by NORAD that Flight 11 had been hijacked. The controller requests military help to intercept the jetliner.  As NEADS is running a training exercise at that point, it inquires as to the veracity of the request, with Boston Center responding that it is "not an exercise, not a test."

8:41: The FAA's New York Center requests information about Flight 11 over the radio. Flight 175 responds: "Ah, we heard a suspicious transmission on our departure out of Boston ah with someone ah, ah sounded like someone keyed the mike and said ah 'everyone ah stay in your seats'". New York Center acknowledges and says it will pass the information on.

8:41: NEADS drives two fighter pilots at Otis Air National Guard Base to battle stations.

8:42: Flight 93, a Boeing 757, takes off with 37 passengers and seven crew members from Newark International Airport (now Newark Liberty International Airport), bound for San Francisco International Airport, following a 40-minute delay due to congested runways. Four hijackers are aboard. Its flight path initially takes it close to the World Trade Center, which is 4 minutes away from being struck, before moving away westwards.

8:42–8:46 (approx.): Flight 175 is hijacked.

8:43:30: While descending at 10,000 feet, Flight 11 makes a final turn, turning south-southwestward towards New York City, aiming for the World Trade Center.

8:44: Flight attendant Amy Sweeney, aboard Flight 11, reports by telephone to Michael Woodward at the American Airlines Flight Services Office in Boston, "Something is wrong. We are in a rapid descent. We are all over the place." A minute later, Woodward asks her to "describe what she sees out the window". She responds, "I see the water. I see the buildings. I see buildings." After a short pause, she reports, "We are flying low. We are flying very, very low. We are flying way too low." Seconds later she says, "Oh, my God, we are way too low." The call ends with a burst of very loud, sustained static.

8:44:05: Another flight in the area, US Airways Flight 583, reports to New York Center that it received a brief emergency locator transmitter signal on 121.5 MHz. Another flight, Delta Air Lines Flight 2433, confirms a minute later that they also picked up a "very faint" signal. Though the signals usually activate when a plane has crashed, neither Flight 11 nor Flight 175 have crashed yet.

8:46:40: Flight 11 crashes at roughly 466 mph (750 km/h, 208 m/s or 405 knots) into the north face of the North Tower (1 WTC) of the World Trade Center, between floors 93 and 99. The aircraft enters the tower intact. It plows to the building's core, severing all three gypsum-encased stairwells, dragging combustibles with it. The combustibles and the remnants of the aircraft are ignited by the burning fuel. A large fireball erupts out of the tower, and a powerful shock wave travels down to the ground and up again. Burning fuel pours down through the elevator shafts. People below the severed stairwells start to evacuate, but no one at or above the impact zone is able to do so. The occupants of Floor 92, the final floor unaffected by the actual crash, are also trapped due to rubble from the destroyed floors directly above blocking the stairwells and the elevators being rendered inoperable by the plane strike.

BBC correspondent Stephen Evans was sitting in the foyer of the South Tower and described hearing a "huge bang like somebody dropped a skip full of rubbish" followed by "two or three similar huge explosions", as the South Tower shook. French filmmakers Jules and Gedeon Naudet and Czech immigrant Pavel Hlava videotape the crash of Flight 11 with their video cameras from different locations. A camera belonging to local New York television station WNYW records the sound of the crash. While the exact moment of impact is not seen, the camera does record the image of the burning tower seconds afterward.

8:46:43: Chief of the New York City Fire Department's 1st Battalion, Joseph W. Pfeifer, makes the first fire department radio message advising the FDNY Manhattan Fire Dispatch Office of the crash. Chief Pfeifer and personnel from other fire companies were several blocks north, on the corner of Church Street and Lispenard Street investigating an odor of gas in the street, and witnessed the attack, along with Jules Naudet, who was accompanying the firefighters at the time:

Battalion 1 Chief (Chief Pfeifer): Battalion 1 to Manhattan.

Manhattan Dispatch: Battalion 1, 'kay.

Battalion 1 Chief (Chief Pfeifer): We just had a plane crash into the upper floor of the World Trade Center. Transmit a 2nd Alarm and start re-located companies into the area.

Manhattan Dispatch: 10-4 [message received], Battalion 1.

8:46:48: Two F-15 fighter jets are ordered to scramble from Otis Air National Guard Base, intended to intercept Flight 11.

Senior Weapons Director Fox: This is HUNTRESS with an active air defense scramble for Panta 45, 46, time 12:46, authenticate delta x-ray. Scramble immediately, Panta 45, 46, heading 280, flight level 290, contact HUNTRESS on frequency 228.9, back-up 364.2. All parties acknowledge with initials.

Because Flight 11's transponder is off, the pilots do not know the location of their target. When Flight 11 crashed, its track disappeared from radar. NEADS spends the next several minutes watching their radar screens in anticipation of Flight 11 returning a radar contact. However, unknown to NEADS at the time, Flight 11 has already impacted the North Tower. NEADS will not become aware of the crash at the World Trade Center until 8:50am.

8:47:39: Boston Center and New York Center contact other flight controllers in the area, stating that they have lost Flight 11. Roughly a minute later, New York Center passes on information supplied by Kennedy Tower about a fire at the World Trade Center.

New York Center: Kennedy Tower reports...you serious? Kennedy Tower reports that there was a fire at the World Trade Center. And that's, ah, that's the area where we lost the airplane.

8:48–10:28: An estimated 200 people, trapped by the damage caused by Flight 11’s impact, fall to their deaths from the North Tower. Most of these people choose to die by jumping to their deaths as a quicker alternative to being burned alive or dying from smoke inhalation, although some of them merely lose their grip and fall whilst being near or outside of the windows. No form of airborne evacuation is attempted as smoke is too dense for a successful landing on the roof of either tower.

8:48:08: WNYW breaks into a Paramount Pictures movie trailer for Zoolander to make the first broadcast report of an incident at the World Trade Center, less than two minutes after Flight 11's crash.  One of the station's camera crews, already out on location at City Hall Park that morning for New York's mayoral primary election, takes the first live pictures of black smoke coming from the North Tower. As these pictures are broadcast, the voice of reporter Dick Oliver is heard as he reports from the scene to anchor Jim Ryan, who was not in the studio at the time:

Three minutes later, Jim Ryan corrected the location of the first plane crash from the South Tower to the North Tower.

8:48:29: The first radio report of the incident is heard on WCBS-AM through traffic reporter Tom Kaminski. WCBS' traffic reports are delivered every ten minutes "on the 8s", meaning that Kaminski's traffic report was to come within two minutes of the initial impact of Flight 11 (although there is no record of how much time actually passed). At the time Kaminski was in "Chopper 880", WCBS' helicopter that he reports from for morning and evening rush hour traffic reports. The following consists of WCBS anchor Pat Carroll crossing to Kaminski in the chopper before he files his report.

Pat Carroll: WCBS news time, 8:48, it's traffic and weather together sponsored by Henry Miller's Theatre. Tom Kaminski, Chopper 880.

Tom Kaminski: Alright uh, Pat, we are just currently getting a look at the World Trade Center, We have something that has happened here at the World Trade Center. We noticed flame and an awful lot of smoke from one of the towers of the World Trade Center. We are just coming up on this scene, this is easily three-quarters of the way up. We are… This is… Whatever has occurred has just occurred, uh, within minutes and, uh, we are trying to determine exactly what that is. But currently we have a lot of smoke at the top of the towers of the World Trade Center, we will keep you posted.

8:49:03: Local New York public radio station WNYC host Mark Hilan broadcasts that station's first report of the incident.

8:49: The first report of an incident at the World Trade Center crosses the Associated Press newswire.

8:49:34: The first network television and radio reports of an explosion or incident at the World Trade Center. CNN breaks into a Ditech commercial at 8:49. The CNN screen subtitle first reads "WORLD TRADE CENTER DISASTER". Carol Lin, the first TV network anchor to break the news of the attacks, says:

Just a minute later, Sean Murtagh, CNN vice president of finance, in an on-air phone call, says from his office in the CNN New York bureau that a large passenger commercial jet was seen to hit the World Trade Center. Murtagh is the first network employee on the air. The first email bulletins of breaking news from CNN and MSNBC report "fire at tower of World Trade Center". Both CNN and MSNBC's websites receive such heavy traffic that many of their web servers fail under the strain of the vast amounts of traffic. BBC News web servers remain operational, and their website shows a picture of the North Tower on fire. Minutes later, email news bulletins revise the reports of fire to a plane crash.

8:50: NEADS is notified that a plane has struck the World Trade Center as they continue to try to locate Flight 11 on radar.

8:50: FDNY 1st Battalion chief Joseph Pfeifer is the first fire chief to enter the World Trade Center after the North Tower impact.  He is joined by several FDNY companies on entry as he starts setting up command in the tower.

8:50: Local New York radio station WOR news anchor Ed Walsh makes that station's first on-air report of the incident.

8:50: WCBS-TV in New York breaks away from the CBS network to cover the attack, with anchor Mike Pomeranz providing that station's first report.

8:50: CNBC interrupts an episode of Squawk Box hosted by Mark Haines with a report of the unfolding attack.

8:50: Local New York cable television channel NY1 anchor Pat Kiernan begins that channel's coverage of the incident.

8:50: Local New York radio station WABC news anchor George Weber broadcasts that station's first report of the incident.

8:50–8:54 (approx.): Flight 77 is hijacked.

8:51: ABC, the first terrestrial television network to break news of the attack, was airing Good Morning America at the time. After returning from a commercial break, WABC-TV in New York breaks away from the ABC network, with anchor Steve Bartelstein beginning that station's own local coverage of the disaster, while on the network, GMA host Diane Sawyer makes this statement:

We want to tell you what we know, as we know it, but we just got a report in that there's been some sort of explosion at the World Trade Center in New York City. 
One report said, and we can't confirm any of this, that a plane may have hit one of the two towers of the World Trade Center, but again, you are seeing the live pictures here.  We have no further details than that.  We don't know anything about what they have concluded happened there this morning.  But we're going to find out, and of course, make sure that everybody knows on the air.

8:51: Local New York television station WNBC breaks away from the NBC network to begin its coverage of the attack, with anchor Jane Hanson providing that station's initial report.

8:51: Matt Lauer, co-host of NBC News' Today, interrupts an interview with author Richard Hack and says to the audience, "We wanna go live right now, and show you a picture of the World Trade Center, where I understand... Do we have it?" However, NBC did not immediately have the picture ready and went to a regularly scheduled commercial break. They return with a shot of the burning tower.

8:51: A flight controller at the FAA's New York Center notices that Flight 175 had changed its transponder code twice four minutes earlier; he tries to contact the flight.  Another flight in the area, Delta Airlines flight 1489, reports the sight of smoke coming from lower Manhattan to New York Center.  This is the first word any pilots in flight receive of the incident.

8:51: New York City's Amateur Radio Emergency Service net is activated, with ham operators in the area assisting with emergency communications.

8:51:34: WINS-AM interrupts its 8:51 traffic report and anchor James Faherty relays word of the crash of Flight 11 to the listening audience, with the station having been notified by one of its employees who lives near the site.

8:52: Lee Hanson receives a phone call from his son, Peter, a passenger on United 175, who says: "I think they've taken over the cockpit—an attendant has been stabbed—and someone else up front may have been killed. The plane is making strange moves. Call United Airlines—tell them it's Flight 175, Boston to LA." Also on board Flight 175, a flight attendant calls a United Airlines office in Chicago, reporting that the flight had been hijacked, both pilots had been killed, a flight attendant had been stabbed, and the hijackers were probably flying the plane.

8:52: The F-15s at Otis Air National Guard Base are airborne. Still lacking an intercept vector to Flight 11 (and not aware that it has already crashed), they are sent to military controlled airspace off Long Island and ordered to remain in a holding pattern until between 9:09 and 9:13.

8:52: Anchor Chris Jansing makes the first announcement on MSNBC of a plane crash into the World Trade Center.

8:52: CBS interrupts The Early Show to report the news of the attack. Bryant Gumbel makes the announcement that a plane has crashed into the World Trade Center.

8:52: CBC Newsworld anchor Mark Kelley makes the first Canadian television report of the first plane crash.

8:52: Sky News presenter Kay Burley breaks the news of the first plane crash to the UK.

8:53: Network Ten news anchor Sandra Sully makes the first report of the incident over Australian television.

8:53:23: Business presenter John Terrett puts out the first report of the disaster over BBC News 24 in the UK.

8:53: Fox News comes back from a commercial break to report the attack. E. D. Hill informs viewers that a plane crashed into the North Tower.

8:54: Flight 77 deviates from its assigned course, turning south over Ohio.

8:54: BBC World news anchor Nisha Pillai makes that channel's first report of the disaster. The channel does not start continuous coverage until 9:00.

8:55 (approx.): An announcement is made over the building-wide PA system by officials in the still-undamaged South Tower of the World Trade Center, "The building is secure, please return to your desks." This announcement is reacted to in numerous ways, ranging from people going back to their offices as suggested, ignoring it and evacuating anyway, or congregating in common areas such as the 78th floor sky lobby.

8:55: President George W. Bush arrives at Emma E. Booker Elementary School in Sarasota, Florida, as part of a scheduled visit to promote education and is reading The Pet Goat when White House Chief of Staff Andrew Card, who is with Bush, informs him that a small twin-engine plane has crashed into the World Trade Center. Before entering the classroom, the President speaks to National Security Advisor Condoleezza Rice, who is at the White House. She first tells him it was a twin-engine aircraft—and then a commercial aircraft—that had struck the World Trade Center, adding "that's all we know right now, Mr. President."

8:56: Ten minutes after the North Tower of the World Trade Center was hit by Flight 11, the transponder on Flight 77 is turned off and even primary radar contact with the aircraft is lost. During radar blackout Flight 77 turns east, unnoticed by flight controllers. When primary radar information is restored at 9:05, controllers searching for Flight 77 to the west of its previous position are unable to find it. Flight 77 travels undetected for 36 minutes on a course heading due east toward Washington, D.C.

8:58: Flight 175 makes a final turn toward New York City.

8:59: Flight 175 passenger Brian Sweeney leaves a message via airphone to his wife Julie:

Jules, this is Brian listen, I'm on an airplane that's been hijacked. If things don't go well, and it's not looking good, I just want you to know I absolutely love you, I want you to do good, go have good times, same to my parents and everybody, and I just totally love you, and I'll see you when you get there. Bye, babe. I hope I call you.

9:00 a.m.

9:00: Lee Hanson receives a second call from his son Peter, aboard Flight 175:

"It's getting bad, Dad. A stewardess was stabbed. They seem to have knives and Mace. They said they have a bomb. It's getting very bad on the plane. Passengers are throwing up and getting sick. The plane is making jerky movements. I don't think the pilot is flying the plane. I think we are going down. I think they intend to go to Chicago or someplace and fly into a building. Don't worry, Dad. If it happens, it'll be very fast. My God, my God."

The call ends abruptly, as Lee Hanson hears a woman scream.

9:01–9:02: A manager from the FAA's New York Center tells the Air Traffic Control System Command Center in Herndon, Virginia:

New York Center: We have several situations going on here. It's escalating big, big time. We need to get the military involved with us.

ATCSCC: We're, we're involved with something else, we have other aircraft that may have a similar situation going on here.

9:01: FAA's New York Center contacts New York terminal approach control and asks for help in locating Flight 175.

9:01: News anchor Lynne White of local New York television station WPIX (channel 11) begins that station's report on the attack.

9:01: The first Japanese television report of the disaster is made over NHK Television by news anchor Masaaki Horio.

9:02: Evacuation of both World Trade Center towers is ordered by FDNY Battalion Chief Joseph Pfeifer, who was stationed in the lobby of the North Tower. Although it is uncertain whether the South Tower's deputy fire safety director receives this order, an announcement is made over the tower's PA system to "begin an orderly evacuation if conditions warranted".

9:03:02: Flight 175 crashes at about 590 mph (950 km/h, 264 m/s or 513 knots) into the south face of the South Tower (2 WTC) of the World Trade Center, between floors 77 and 85. The exploding fuel generates a massive fireball emerging from the southern, eastern and northern facades of the South Tower, noticeably larger than the one from the first impact 17 minutes earlier. East face windows on the already-burning North Tower are smashed as the shockwave from the explosion hits them. Parts of the plane, including the starboard engine, leave the South Tower from its east and north sides, falling to the ground six blocks away. All 65 people on board the aircraft die instantly on impact, and unknown hundreds in the building as well. By this time, several media organizations, including the three major American broadcast television networks (which have interrupted their morning shows), are covering the immediate aftermath of the first plane crash, and so millions of viewers see the impact live. New York's WNYW is among the first to specifically report that a second plane has crashed into the complex (many other news agencies do not realize that a second plane has crashed until several minutes later):

Jim Ryan: Oh, my goodness. There's another one. Oh, my goodness. There's another one!

Lyn Brown: This seems to be on purpose.

Jim Ryan: Oh, my goodness. Now you...

Kai Simonsen (WNYW helicopter reporter): Was that a plane?

Jim Ryan: Now it's obvious. I think that there's a second plane just crashed into the World Trade Center. I think we have a terrorist act of proportions that we cannot begin to imagine at this juncture.

Kai Simonsen: Oh, my God.

Jim Ryan: My goodness, a second plane now has crashed into the other tower of the World Trade Center. Obviously, suicide terrorist attack on the World Trade Center. What we have... what we have been fearing... what we have been fearing for the longest time here apparently has come to pass. A disastrous terrorist attack on the World Trade Center. Both towers, planes smashing into each one.

A massive evacuation begins in the South Tower below its impact zone. One of the stairwells in the South Tower remains unblocked from the top to the bottom of the tower because of the plane hitting at an offset from the vertical center line of the building, but it is filled with smoke. This leads many people to mistakenly go upwards towards the roof for a rooftop rescue that never comes. The Port Authority of New York and New Jersey kept the two sets of heavy metal doors leading to the building's only roof exit tightly locked. The impact severs communication with several television and radio broadcast towers at the WTC; WPIX's satellite feed freezes on a still image of the second impact which is all the station broadcasts until alternate transmitters are set up hours later.  The affected television stations' terrestrial signals go off the air, however, they continue to broadcast, with their signals still receivable through local cable TV systems in the area, and WCBS-TV having backup transmitter facilities atop the Empire State Building.

Because of the North Tower's obstruction of the South Tower from certain camera angles, some are initially unaware that a second plane has struck the South Tower, and instead mistakenly believe that the second explosion has occurred in the North Tower. As instant replays of the second plane crash are shown, the anchors on the three major broadcast networks speculate on whether they are witnessing a terrorist attack or some sort of very rare accident. CNN changes its headline to read "Second plane crashes into World Trade Center." The crash occurred as CNN was taking a feed from WABC-TV, and anchor Steve Bartelstein first assumed that the explosion seen was caused when the fuselage of the first plane exploded.

9:03: President Bush enters a classroom as part of his school visit.

9:03: FAA's New York Center notifies NORAD (NEADS) of the hijacking of Flight 175, at the same time it crashes.

9:04: Fox News Channel anchor Jon Scott mentions Osama bin Laden as a possible suspect.

9:04 (approximately): The FAA's Boston Air Route Traffic Control Center stops all departures from airports in its jurisdiction (New England and eastern New York State).

9:05: After brief introductions to the Booker elementary students, President Bush is about to begin reading The Pet Goat with the students when Chief of Staff Andrew Card interrupts to whisper to the president, "A second plane hit the second tower. America is under attack." The president stated later that he decided to continue the lesson rather than alarm the students.

9:06: The FAA begins imposing blanket temporary flight restrictions, with the first restriction banning takeoffs of all flights bound to or through the airspace of New York Center from airports in that Center and the three adjacent Centers—Boston, Cleveland, and Washington. This is referred to as a First Tier groundstop and covers the Northeast from North Carolina north and as far west as eastern Michigan.

9:08: The FAA bans all takeoffs nationwide for flights going to or through New York Center airspace. ABC News reports later that the Port Authority of New York and New Jersey, the agency that runs the New York-area airports, asked the FAA for permission to close down the New York Center airspace.

9:11: The last PATH train leaves the World Trade Center. The station was vacant when the towers collapsed.

9:11: ABC News anchor Peter Jennings begins reporting on the disaster.

9:13: The F-15 fighters from Otis Air National Guard Base leave military airspace near Long Island, bound for Manhattan.

9:14: President Bush returns to an adjacent classroom commandeered by the U.S. Secret Service. The classroom contains a telephone, a television showing the news coverage, and several senior staff members. The president speaks to Vice President Dick Cheney, Condoleezza Rice, New York Governor George Pataki, and FBI Director Robert Mueller, and prepares brief remarks.

9:15: NBC News reports unconfirmed statements from employees at United Airlines that an American Airlines aircraft had been hijacked prior to its destruction.

9:17: The FAA closes down all New York City-area airports. The city had initially asked the FAA to close down the airports.

9:17:02: CBS News correspondent Jim Stewart in Washington mentions that in the intelligence community, Osama bin Laden is a probable suspect.

9:18: CNN makes reference to foul play for the first time, stating the FBI was investigating a report of plane hijacking. CNN changes headline to read "AP: Plane was hijacked before crashes".

9:19: United Airlines flight dispatcher Ed Ballinger begins sending warning text messages to his flights: "Beware any cockpit intrusion—Two a/c [aircraft] hit World Trade Center." Because he was sending this warning to his 16 transcontinental flights, this takes several minutes.

9:21: All bridges and tunnels into Manhattan closed.

9:21: Transport Canada, Canada's transportation agency, activates its Situation Centre (SitCen) in Ottawa.

9:23: Ballinger's warning message is sent to both Flight 93 and 175, and is received in the cockpit of Flight 93 a minute later.

9:24-9:38 (approximately): Three people fall from a window on the southeast side of the South Tower's 79th floor over the course of several minutes. The first is seen jumping to his death while the next two make an attempt to climb down before slipping. Down at street level, one of them lands on firefighter Danny Suhr as he prepares to enter the South Tower, killing them both. Besides these three individuals, nobody else is seen falling from the South Tower that day―an obvious dissimilarity from the situation in the North Tower, where nearly 200 people continuously fell to their deaths for nearly the entire time it burned.

9:24: The FAA notifies NORAD (NEADS) about the suspected hijacking of Flight 77. The FAA and NORAD establish an open line to discuss Flight 77, and shortly thereafter Flight 93.

9:25: The Otis-based F-15s establish an air patrol over Manhattan.

9:25: A video teleconference begins to be set up in the White House Situation Room, led by Richard A. Clarke, a special assistant to the president, that eventually includes the CIA, the FBI, the departments of State, Justice, and Defense, and the FAA.

9:25: The Associated Press informs CNN that the two plane crashes in the World Trade Center appeared to be an "act of terrorism".

9:26: The FAA bans takeoffs of all civilian aircraft regardless of destination—a national groundstop.

9:26: White House counterterrorism chief Richard Clarke indicates he gave the instruction to raise the worldwide force protection condition for U.S military bases at around this time.  This is likely the earliest instance this actual order was issued.  Other evidence suggests the threat condition increase took place in steps, with the next step occurring sometime over the next hour. See link 

9:26: Flight 93's pilot, Jason Dahl, replies to Ballinger's text message, "Ed, confirm latest mesg plz – Jason".

9:26: NBC News correspondent Andrea Mitchell reports to MSNBC anchor Lester Holt that a top U.S. government official informed her that one of the two planes that hit the Twin Towers was an American Airlines plane from Boston to Los Angeles that was hijacked.

9:28: Hijackers storm the cockpit on Flight 93 and take over the flight. The entry of the hijackers is overheard by flight controllers at Cleveland.

9:29: President Bush makes his first public statements about the attacks, in front of an audience of about 200 teachers and students at the elementary school. He states that he will be going back to Washington. "Today, we've had a national tragedy," he starts. "Two airplanes… have crashed… into the World Trade Center… in an apparent terrorist attack on our country," and leads a moment of silence. No one in the President's traveling party has any information during this time that other aircraft were hijacked or missing.

9:30: Reuters reports that a plane was hijacked from Boston.

9:30: In the North Tower, six men escape express elevator Car 69-A. The elevator, which had been designed to traverse much of the building to reach the upper floors more quickly, had gotten stuck at the 50th Floor when Flight 11 hit the tower. With no exit at this floor, window cleaner Jan Demczur used his squeegee to attempt to cut a hole in the Sheetrock lining the elevator shaft. When the squeegee’s blade broke off and fell down the elevator shaft, he and the other five people in the elevator alternately used the handle to scrape away at the lining, eventually cutting a hole large enough for them to escape into an adjacent bathroom. They are found by firefighters, who immediately escort them to a stairwell. All six safely leave the tower five minutes before it collapses.

9:32: A radio transmission from Flight 93 is overheard by flight controllers at Cleveland: "Ladies and gentlemen, here is the captain please sit down. Keep remaining sitting. We have a bomb on board. So sit."

9:32: Controllers at the Dulles Terminal Radar Approach Control in Virginia observe "a primary radar target tracking eastbound at a high rate of speed", referring to Flight 77.

9:33–9:34: A tower supervisor at Reagan National Airport tells Secret Service operations center at the White House that "an aircraft is coming at you and not talking with us," referring to Flight 77. The White House is about to be evacuated when the tower reports that Flight 77 has turned and is approaching Reagan National Airport.

9:34: The FAA's Command Center relays information concerning Flight 93 to FAA headquarters.

9:35: The President's motorcade departs from the elementary school, bound for Sarasota–Bradenton International Airport and Air Force One.

9:35: Flight 93 reverses direction over northeast Ohio and starts flying eastwards.

9:35: Based on a report that Flight 77 had turned again and was circling back toward the District of Columbia, the Secret Service orders the immediate evacuation of the Vice President from the White House.

9:36: Cleveland advises the FAA Command Center that it is still tracking Flight 93 and inquires whether someone had requested the military to launch fighter aircraft to intercept the aircraft.

9:37: Vice President Cheney enters a tunnel leading to the Presidential Emergency Operations Center, located under the White House East Wing.

9:37:46: Flight 77 crashes into the western side of the Pentagon at 530 mph (853 km/h, 237 m/s, or 460 knots) and starts a violent fire. The section of the Pentagon hit consists mainly of newly renovated, unoccupied offices. All 64 people on board are killed, as are 125 Pentagon personnel.

9:39: Another radio transmission is heard from Ziad Jarrah aboard Flight 93: "Uh, this is the captain. I would like you all to remain seated. We have a bomb on board and are going back to the airport, and to have our demands, so please remain quiet."

9:39: Fox News Channel correspondent David Asman reports, "We – we are hearing – right now that another explosion that – has taken place. At the Pentagon."

9:39: NBC News Pentagon correspondent Jim Miklaszewski reports that "it felt, just a few moments ago, like there was an explosion of some kind here at the Pentagon." NBC and MSNBC relay reports of the explosion but do not relay word of the crash of Flight 77 as they do not know the cause.

9:40: Video teleconference in White House Situation Room begins with the physical security of the President, the White House, and federal agencies. They are not yet aware of the Pentagon crash.

9:40:49: CNN's Breaking News bulletin reads "Reports of fire at Pentagon."

9:41: Local Washington, DC television station WUSA breaks away from the CBS network, with anchor Andrea Roane beginning that station's local coverage of the explosion at The Pentagon.

9:41:15: The photograph The Falling Man is taken.

9:42: ABC News broadcasts its first pictures from Washington, D.C. of heavy smoke, from a perspective on the other side of the Eisenhower Executive Office Building, which is situated a block west of the White House.  Peter Jennings confirms a fire at The Pentagon two minutes later.

9:42: The main CBS network reports an explosion at the Pentagon.

9:42: Senior FAA traffic manager Ben Sliney issues the execution order for SCATANA grounding all air traffic over the United States and diverting any incoming international traffic to alternate destinations.

9:43: Abu Dhabi TV reports it received a call from the Democratic Front for the Liberation of Palestine, claiming responsibility for the World Trade Center attack, but this is soon denied by a senior officer of the group.

9:43: The White House and the Capitol are evacuated and closed.

9:45: United States airspace is shut down. No civilian aircraft are allowed to take off, and all aircraft in flight are ordered to land at the nearest airport as soon as possible. Nearly all international flights headed for the U.S. are redirected to Canada, while some flights from South America are diverted to Mexico. Transport Canada orders a complete closedown of Canadian airspace, but the Mexican airspace did not shut down. The FAA announces that civilian flights are suspended until at least noon September 12, while Transport Canada gives similar orders; the FAA further ordered that diverted U.S.-bound international flights should be taken in, launching the agency's "Operation Yellow Ribbon", with CFB Goose Bay being the first Canadian air facility to receive airliners originally bound for the U.S. Other airports across Canada received varying numbers of airliners; Gander International Airport in Gander, Newfoundland and Labrador hosted 38 planes, consisting of 6,122 passengers and 473 crew, the second largest number out of any Canadian airport other than Halifax. The groundings would eventually last until September 14. Military and medical flights as well as Con Air flights continue. This is the fourth time all commercial flights in the U.S. have been stopped, and the first time a suspension was unplanned. All previous suspensions were military-related (Sky Shield I-III), from 1960 to 1962. Many newspapers (including The New York Times) mistakenly print that this is the first time flights have been suspended. This was, however, the first time commercial flights in Canada were stopped. 

9:45: CNN receives initial reports that, in addition to a fire at the Pentagon, there is also a fire at the National Mall. These reports on the National Mall, however, are later proven to be false.

9:46:36: The ARD news magazine Tagesthemen, hosted by Ulrich Wickert, broadcasts news of the attacks to Germany.

9:49: The FAA Command Center at Herndon suggests that someone at FAA headquarters should decide whether to request military assistance with Flight 93. Ultimately, the FAA makes no request before it crashes.

9:50 (approximately): The Associated Press reports that Flight 11 was apparently hijacked after departure from Boston's Logan Airport. Within an hour this is confirmed for both Flight 11 and Flight 175.

9:51: Chief Orio Palmer of the FDNY's 7th Battalion reaches the 78th Floor Sky Lobby of the South Tower along with Fire Marshal Ronald Bucca. Palmer reports that there are two pockets of fire and numerous dead bodies.

9:52: The National Security Agency intercepts a phone call between a known associate of Osama bin Laden in Afghanistan and someone in the Republic of Georgia, announcing that he had heard "good news", and that another target was still to be hit.

9:53: CNN confirms a plane crash at the Pentagon.

9:55: A CNN correspondent mentions Osama bin Laden as someone determined to strike the US.

9:55: Air Force One leaves Sarasota-Bradenton International Airport.

9:57: Passenger revolt begins on Flight 93.

9:57: President Bush leaves Sarasota, Florida, on Air Force One. The plane reaches cruising altitude and circles for approximately 40 minutes while the destination of the plane is discussed.

9:58:59: The South Tower of the World Trade Center collapses, 55 minutes after the impact of Flight 175. Its destruction is viewed and heard by a vast television and radio audience. As the roar of the collapse goes silent, tremendous gray-white clouds of pulverized concrete and gypsum rush through the streets. Most observers think a new explosion or impact has produced smoke and debris that now obscures the South Tower, but once the wind clears the smoke, it becomes clear that the building is no longer standing. Nobody who is still inside the South Tower at the time of its collapse survives. NY1 correspondent Kristen Shaughnessy, on the scene of the disaster, reports on the collapse of the South Tower at the instant it begins, while ABC News correspondent Don Dahler, who was home at the time of the incident and lived near the site, reports to anchor Peter Jennings on air that he has witnessed the tower collapse; Dahler's report is perhaps the first broadcast specific confirmation of a collapse as his report is filed seconds after the event.

9:59: As the South Tower collapses, Father Mychal Judge, OFM, chaplain to the FDNY, is struck by falling debris on the lobby level of the North Tower. He dies of blunt force trauma to the head. He is found by Chief Pfeifer, Jules Naudet, and others from the North Tower Command Post who fled when they heard the South Tower collapse and took refuge in the nearby escalator as the debris cloud engulfed them. As Judge's body is the first recovered and certified by the medical examiner's office, he will be designated "Victim 0001" of the September 11 attacks.

10:00 a.m.
10:00: FDNY Battalion Chief Joseph Pfeifer (inside of the still standing North Tower) orders all FDNY personnel to evacuate, via radio.

Battalion 1 Chief (Chief Pfeifer): Command post, Tower 1, all units. Evacuate the building. Command post, to all units.

Due to many communication limitations, numerous firefighters within the tower do not receive this transmission. Some personnel who do not hear the order only leave the building after being told by other firefighters that an evacuation order has been given. Others never receive the order at all.

10:01: The FAA Command Center advises FAA headquarters that an aircraft had seen Flight 93 "waving his wings," the hijackers' efforts to defeat the passengers' counterattack.

10:02: Communicators with the Vice President in the Presidential Emergency Operations Center begin receiving reports from the Secret Service of an inbound aircraft—presumably hijacked—heading toward Washington. This is Flight 93.

10:02: CNN announces that the Sears Tower in Chicago has been evacuated.

10:03 (approximately): The National Military Command Center learns from the White House of Flight 93's hijacking.

10:03:11: Flight 93 crashes at 583 mph (926 km/h, 272 m/s, or 509 knots), due to fighting in the cockpit, 80 miles (129 km) southeast of Pittsburgh in Somerset County, Pennsylvania. Later reports indicate that passengers had learned about the World Trade Center and Pentagon crashes on cell phones and at least three were planning on resisting the hijackers; the resistance was confirmed by Flight 93's cockpit voice recording, on which the hijackers are heard making their decision to down the plane before the passengers succeed in breaching the cockpit door. The intended target of Flight 93 is thought to be either the U.S. Capitol Building or the White House in Washington D.C. The crash of Flight 93 also signified the end of the attacks, as all of the hijackers were now dead and all of the hijacked planes were destroyed.

10:05: Andrea Mitchell, reporting for NBC from outside the Pentagon, reports that Osama bin Laden may have been involved in the attacks.

10:05: CNN's headlines read: "SOUTH TOWER AT WTC COLLAPSES."

10:05: The IDS Center in Minneapolis is evacuated.

10:07: NBC reports for the first time that the South Tower of the World Trade Center has collapsed. Prior to this time they have said only that a section of the building has fallen away.

10:07: NEADS, controlling the only set of fighters over Washington, first learns of the hijacking of Flight 93, 4 minutes after it actually crashed.

10:08: Air Traffic Control System Command Center in Herndon reports to FAA headquarters that Flight 93 may be down near Johnstown, Pennsylvania; at 10:17 the Command Center concludes it is so.

10:10: National Military Command Center directs Threat Condition Delta for U.S. military bases worldwide.

10:10: Part of the west side of the Pentagon collapses.

10:10: NEADS emphatically tells fighter pilots over Washington, "Negative clearance to shoot."

10:10–10:15 (approximately): Vice President Cheney, unaware that Flight 93 has crashed, authorizes fighter aircraft to engage the inbound plane, reported to be 80 miles (129 km) from Washington, based not on radar (from which it has disappeared) but speed and trajectory projections.

10:13: Thousands are involved in an evacuation of the United Nations complex in New York.

10:13–10:22: The 9/11 Commission's estimated arrival of Flight 93 over Washington had it not crashed in Pennsylvania.

10:14–10:19: A lieutenant colonel at the White House repeatedly relays to the NMCC that the Vice President has confirmed that fighters are cleared to engage inbound aircraft if they can verify that the aircraft was hijacked.

10:15: CNN's headline reads, "EXPLOSION ON CAPITOL HILL."

10:18: NBC reports that Yasser Arafat, Chairman of the Palestine Liberation Organization (PLO), has denied complicity in the attacks and is appalled by them.

10:20: President Bush, aboard Air Force One, tells Vice President Cheney that he has authorized a shootdown of aircraft if necessary.

10:23: The Associated Press reports a car bomb has exploded outside the State Department in Washington, D.C. This and several other reports of terrorist acts in the capital are quickly found to be false.

10:24: Two men who were being evacuated through the underground shopping mall below the South Tower when it collapsed on them are able to climb up through thirty feet of debris to safety. 1010 WINS in New York City reports an explosion at the U.S. Supreme Court building. This is later revealed to be erroneous.

10:28:25: The North Tower of the World Trade Center collapses. Due to the destruction of the gypsum-encased stairwells on the impact floors (most skyscraper stairwells are encased in reinforced concrete), no one who was above the impact zone in the North Tower escapes the collapse. Unlike the South Tower's collapse, which killed everyone still inside the building, 16 individuals who were inside the collapsing North Tower survived and would later be rescued. The Marriott Hotel, located at the base of the two towers, is also destroyed. The second collapse is also viewed live on television and heard on radio. The North Tower collapses 1 hour and 42 minutes after the impact of Flight 11—the building had continued burning even after the attacks ended with the crash of Flight 93. 7 World Trade Center burns after the collapse of the North Tower. New York City's 1010 WINS reports the collapse live as it happens, broadcasting a live phone call with WINS news director Ben Mevorach, who witnessed the collapse from the Manhattan Bridge. On NBC News, Katie Couric says: "The other tower of the World Trade Center has just collapsed."

Several long-distance videos of the collapse, such as CNN, were able to notice that, after the cloud of dust had partially cleared away, a portion of the building was still standing. It appeared to be the lower half of the northwest corner column of the North Tower, which, like a spire, grew larger and had more structure still standing near the bottom. The portion rose to a fairly good height considering the collapse around it, as it appeared to rise nearly forty stories off the ground. This piece remained standing for a few seconds after the initial collapse before it also came down. The debris cloud from the North Tower's collapse is also significantly larger and more far-reaching than that of the South Tower's, due to dust from that collapse being kicked up as the North Tower fell.

10:31: NORAD first communicates the Vice President's shootdown authority to NEADS.

10:35: Air Force One, carrying the President, turns for Barksdale Air Force Base in Bossier City, Louisiana.

10:37: Associated Press reports that officials at the Somerset County Airport confirm that a large plane has crashed in western Pennsylvania. CNN's Aaron Brown passes along reports that a 747 is "down" in Pennsylvania. He stresses these reports are unconfirmed. He also, in the confusion, reports another plane heading for the Pentagon. The Mall of America in Bloomington, Minnesota, is evacuated and closed. New York City's 1010 WINS relays a report that the U.S. State Department headquarters in Washington, D.C. has been attacked by a car bomb. This is later reported to be false.

10:39: Another hijacked airliner is claimed to be headed for Washington, D.C. F-15s are scrambled and patrol the airspace above Washington, D.C. while other fighter jets sweep the airspace above New York City. They have orders, first issued by Vice President Cheney and later confirmed by President Bush, to shoot down any potentially dangerous planes that do not comply with orders given to them via radio. Eventually, the aircraft is revealed to be a medevac helicopter on its way to the Pentagon.

10:41: NBC News confirms that a plane has "gone down" in Somerset County. The earlier unconfirmed statements about an incident at the State Department in Washington, D.C. are reported as false.

10:43: CNN reports that a mass evacuation of Washington, D.C., and New York has been started. A few minutes later, New York mayor Rudy Giuliani orders an evacuation of Lower Manhattan.

10:49: Fox News Channel is the first of the United States news networks to implement a news ticker at the bottom of its screen for supplementary information about the attacks. CNN adds one at 11:11, and MSNBC adds one at approximately 2:00 p.m. All three cable networks have used a news ticker continuously in the years since, and many local television stations have followed suit.

10:50:19: Five stories of part of the Pentagon collapse due to the fire.

10:53: New York City's primary elections are canceled.

10:53: Defense Secretary Donald Rumsfeld orders the U.S. military placed at DEFCON 3, for the first time since the Yom Kippur War in 1973.

11:00 a.m.

11:00: Transport Canada halts all aircraft departures until further notice, except for police, military, and humanitarian flights, as part of Operation Yellow Ribbon. The operation was well underway as international flights headed for the U.S. had already started to land at Canadian airports, beginning at CFB Goose Bay. Fourteen other airports follow, including Halifax, Lester B. Pearson in Toronto, Montréal-Dorval, and Vancouver.

11:05: The FAA confirms that several planes have been hijacked in addition to American Airlines Flight 11.

11:08: The pilot of Korean Air Flight 85 includes the letters "HJK" a code for hijacked, in an airline text message.

11:16: American Airlines confirms the loss of its two aircraft.

11:26: United Airlines confirms the loss of Flight 93 and states that it is "deeply concerned" about Flight 175.

11:53: United Airlines confirms the loss of its two aircraft.

11:55: The border between the U.S. and Mexico is on highest alert, but is not closed.

12:00 p.m.
12:00: ARINC officials notify NORAD about the use of the hijack code on Flight 85.

12:01: (approximately): Fourteen people, including twelve firefighters, who were in a section of a stairwell in the North Tower that held together during the collapse, climb the stairs to the top of the Ground Zero rubble field.

12:04: Los Angeles International Airport, the intended destination of Flights 11, 77 and 175, is shut down.

12:15: San Francisco International Airport, the intended destination of Flight 93, is shut down.

12:15 (approximately): The airspace over the 48 contiguous United States is clear of all commercial and private flights.

12:30 (approximately): Secretary of State Colin Powell boards a plane in Lima, Peru, for Washington, D.C.

12:39: On CNN, Senator John McCain (R-AZ) characterizes the attack as an "act of war."

12:41: Senator Orrin Hatch (R-UT) tells CNN, "Both the FBI and our intelligence community believe that this is Bin Laden's signature."

1:00 p.m.

1:00 (approximately): At the Pentagon, fire crews are still fighting fires. The early response to the attack had been coordinated from the National Military Command Center, but that had to be evacuated when it began to fill with smoke.

1:00 (approximately): Jets are scrambled from Elmendorf Air Force Base to shadow Flight 85.

1:04: President Bush puts the U.S. military on high alert worldwide (known as Force Protection Condition Delta). Taped remarks from the President were aired from Barksdale Air Force Base, stating that "freedom itself was attacked this morning by a faceless coward and freedom will be defended." He also said that the "United States will hunt down and punish those responsible for these cowardly acts." He then leaves for a U.S. Strategic Command bunker located at Offutt Air Force Base in Bellevue, Nebraska.

1:24: ATC instructs Flight 85 to change its transponder code to 7500, the universal signal for hijack, expecting that, if they had not been hijacked, the pilots would respond to that effect. Instead, they simply comply with the instruction, which ATC takes as confirmation that the flight has indeed been hijacked.

1:27: Mayor Anthony A. Williams of Washington, D.C., declares a state of emergency; the District of Columbia National Guard arrives on site.

2:00 p.m.

2:39: At a press conference New York Mayor Rudy Giuliani is asked to estimate the number of casualties at the World Trade Center. He replies, "More than any of us can bear."

2:45 (approximately) Alerted that a possible hijacked plane might strike a target in Alaska, Governor Tony Knowles orders the evacuation of potential targets.

2:50: President Bush arrives at Offutt Air Force Base, Bellevue, Nebraska, to convene a National Security Council teleconference via the U.S. STRATCOM bunker.

2:54: Flight 85 lands safely in Whitehorse, On the tarmac, Flight 85 was greeted by armed Royal Canadian Mounted Police officers who, after interrogating the pilots, learned the whole ordeal was caused by a translation error.

3:00 p.m.
3:00 (approx.): Pasquale Buzzelli, who lost consciousness in a North Tower stairway during the collapse, awakens to find himself lying atop the debris with only a fractured foot.

4:00 p.m.

4:00: National news outlets report that high officials in the federal intelligence community are stating that Osama bin Laden is suspect number one.

4:25: The New York Stock Exchange, NASDAQ, and the American Stock Exchange report that they will remain closed Wednesday, September 12.

4:36: President Bush departs Offutt Air Force Base on Air Force One.

5:00 p.m.

5:20:27: The east penthouse on top of 7 World Trade Center crumbles apart.

5:20:33: 7 World Trade Center, a 47-story building, collapses. The building contained New York's emergency operations center, operated by the NYC Office of Emergency Management, originally intended to respond to disasters such as the September 11 terrorist attacks. Due to the emergency personnel having more than enough time to evacuate the building since the collapse of the North Tower, there are no injuries or deaths as a result of the collapse.

6:00 p.m.

6:00: Explosions and tracer fire are reported in Kabul, Afghanistan by CNN and the BBC (early hours of September 12 local time). The Northern Alliance, involved in a civil war with the Taliban government, is later reported to have attacked Kabul's airport with helicopter gunships.

6:00: The last of the aircraft headed for the U.S. lands in Canada at Vancouver International Airport, since it was flying over the Pacific.

6:54: U.S. President George W. Bush arrives at the White House in Washington, D.C.

7:00 p.m.

7:00: Efforts to locate survivors in the rubble that had been the twin towers continue. Fleets of ambulances are lined up to transport the injured to nearby hospitals, but they stand empty. "Ground Zero", as the site of the WTC collapse becomes known henceforth, is the exclusive domain of New York City's Fire Department and Police Department, despite volunteer steel and construction workers who stand ready to move large quantities of debris quickly. Relatives and friends of victims or likely victims, many displaying enlarged photographs of the missing printed on home computer printers, have appeared around New York. The New York Armory at Lexington Avenue and 26th Street and Union Square Park at 14th Street and Broadway become centers of vigil.

7:24: Members of Congress join on the steps of the United States Capitol and sing "God Bless America".

7:30: The U.S. government denies any responsibility for the reported explosions in Kabul, capital of Afghanistan.

7:30: The Petronas Twin Towers in Kuala Lumpur, capital of Malaysia, are evacuated following reports of a bomb threat (8:30 am on September 12 local time).

8:00 p.m.

8:00 (approx.): Port Authority Police Officer Will Jimeno, who was in an underground corridor between the two towers, is found alive in the rubble, and eventually freed at approximately 11:00 p.m.

8:30: U.S. President George W. Bush addresses the country from the White House in Washington, D.C. Among his statements:

As Bush speaks, members of Congress tell CNN that during private briefings with senior administration officials, they were told that the administration had enough evidence that it was "confident" the attacks are the work of Osama bin Laden and his al-Qaeda terrorist network.

9:00 p.m.
9:00: President Bush meets his full National Security Council, followed roughly half an hour later by a meeting with a smaller group of key advisers. Bush and his advisers have evidence that Osama bin Laden is behind the attacks. Director of Central Intelligence George Tenet says that al-Qaeda and the Taliban in Afghanistan are essentially one and the same. Bush says, "Tell the Taliban we're finished with them."

10:00 p.m.
10:00: There are reports (later proven incorrect) of many survivors buried in rubble in New York making cell phone calls. Only two more survivors will be pulled from the rubble on September 12 and neither of them had made cell phone calls.

11:00 p.m.
11:00: After 13 hours, the NYPD,  FDNY and PAPD finally dig out Will Jimeno. They learn that Port Authority police sergeant John McLoughlin is also trapped. The NYPD, FDNY and PAPD will eventually dig him out at 8:00 a.m. the next morning after he has been there for almost a day.

11:30: Before sleeping, President Bush enters into his journal: "The Pearl Harbor of the 21st century took place today...We think it's Osama bin Laden."

References

Footnotes

Further reading

External links
 "America's Day of Terror: Timeline" – British Broadcasting Corporation
 "Complete 911 Timeline" minute by minute – Provided by the History Commons.
  (Understanding 9/11 archive).
 CNN:  (timeline published Sept. 12).
 911 Case Study: Pentagon Flight 77: 3D Computer Simulation about The Pentagon impact.
 My 9/11 Flight: Airline pilot's account of the SCATANA airspace shutdown on 9/11.
 Pasquale Buzzelli, the "9/11 Surfer" who survived North Tower collapse.
 1010 WINS from 8:00 a.m. (September 11, 2001) to 8:00 a.m. (September 12, 2001) 
 9/11 tragedy pager intercepts, published by WikiLeaks.
 

Articles containing video clips

pl:Przebieg zamachu na World Trade Center i Pentagon